The 2020 Rachael Heyhoe Flint Trophy was the first edition of the Rachael Heyhoe Flint Trophy, an English women's cricket domestic competition, which took place between 29 August and 27 September 2020. It featured eight teams in two groups, and had a final. The tournament was named after former England captain Rachael Heyhoe Flint, Baroness Heyhoe-Flint, who died in 2017.

The competition was won by Southern Vipers, who beat Northern Diamonds in the final.

Background and format

The Rachael Heyhoe Flint Trophy was a 50-over cricket tournament created in 2020 so that English women's cricket could be played in spite of the COVID-19 pandemic. All matches took place behind closed doors due to the COVID-19 pandemic. The England and Wales Cricket Board made some matches available to watch online, and the final was shown live on Sky Sports. The competition was named after former England captain Rachael Heyhoe Flint, Baroness Heyhoe-Flint, who died in 2017.

The competition featured eight teams, who represented regional hubs, which were formed during an overhaul of the English women's domestic cricket structure. The teams were separated into a North and South Group, and each team played six group stage matches, in a double round-robin format. The two group winners played each other in the competition's final. The competition began on 29 August, and ended with the final on 27 September. Originally the final was scheduled for 26 September at the ground of the team with the most points, but the fixture was moved back to 27 September to avoid a clash with an England women's T20 match against the West Indies. Edgbaston was chosen as the venue for the final.

Teams
The teams were as follows:
North Group
 Central Sparks (representing Warwickshire, Worcestershire, Herefordshire, Shropshire and Staffordshire)
 Lightning (representing Loughborough University, Derbyshire, Leicestershire, Nottinghamshire and Lincolnshire)
 Northern Diamonds (representing Yorkshire, Durham and Northumberland)
 North West Thunder (representing Lancashire, Cheshire and Cumbria)

South Group
 South East Stars (representing Surrey and Kent)
 Southern Vipers (representing Hampshire, Sussex, Berkshire, Buckinghamshire, Dorset, Isle of Wight and Oxfordshire)
 Sunrisers  (representing Middlesex, Essex, Northamptonshire, Bedfordshire, Cambridgeshire, Hertfordshire, Huntingdonshire, Norfolk and Suffolk)
 Western Storm (representing Glamorgan, Gloucestershire, Somerset, Cornwall, Devon, Wiltshire and Cricket Wales)

Squads
Each team had a squad of 15 players, and players on England central contracts were available for the competition. All players were paid for participating in the competitions, excluding those already on central contracts. After the squad announcements, England centrally contracted players were added to their teams. England players on a regional retainer contract were assigned to their regional team, and centrally contracted players were assigned appropriately. England players in the squad for the West Indies series were only available for the first two rounds of fixtures.

Southern Vipers were the first team to announce their squad. Their regionally contracted players were Lauren Bell, Georgia Adams, Tara Norris, and Paige Scholfield. Northern Diamonds' squad included former England international cricketer Jenny Gunn and Dutch international cricketer Sterre Kalis. Their centrally contracted players were Hollie Armitage and Beth Langston. South East Stars were captained by Tash Farrant, and their 14 women squad included England players Sophia Dunkley, Alice Davidson-Richards, and Bryony Smith. Lightning's squad included Scottish sisters Kathryn and Sarah Bryce. North West Thunder's squad included England cricketer Alex Hartley, as well as Georgie Boyce and Ellie Threlkeld who received regional retainers. Western Storm were captained by Sophie Luff, and their squad included regionally contracted players Fi Morris and Danielle Gibson. Central Sparks' squad included regionally contracted players Evelyn Jones, Marie Kelly and Issy Wong. Sunrisers were captained by Amara Carr, and their squad included regionally contracted players Naomi Dattani, Cordelia Griffith who received regional retainers, and also included England international cricketer Fran Wilson and Mady Villiers.

Standings 
Teams received 4 points for a win. A bonus point was given where the winning team's run rate is 1.25 or greater times that of the opposition. In case of a tie in the standings, the following tiebreakers were applied in order: highest net run rate, team that scored the most points in matches involving the tied parties, better bowling strike rate, drawing of lots.

North Group

South Group

Group stage
The fixture list was compiled so that every team played twice on the August Bank Holiday weekend.

Source:

North Group

South Group

Final

Statistics
Highest score by a team: Lightning – 303/5 (50 overs) v Central Sparks (19 September).
 Top score by an individual: Georgia Adams – 154* (155) v Western Storm (13 September).
 Best bowling figures by an individual: Charlotte Taylor – 6/34 (10 overs) v Northern Diamonds (27 September).

Most runs

Source: ESPNCricinfo

Most wickets

Source: ESPNCricinfo

References

External links
 Series home at ESPN Cricinfo

2020
2020 in English women's cricket